Dennis Telgenkamp (born 9 May 1987) is a Dutch former professional footballer who played as a goalkeeper. He played for Heracles Almelo, SC Cambuur and FC Emmen.

External links
 

1987 births
Living people
People from Wierden
Association football goalkeepers
Dutch footballers
Heracles Almelo players
SC Cambuur players
FC Emmen players
Eredivisie players
Eerste Divisie players
Footballers from Overijssel